Bandar Baru (known locally simply as 'BB') is a village in Deli Serdang Regency, North Sumatra on the road from Medan to Berastagi. It is located in Sibolangit subdistrict by the Bukit Lawang river, just past Sibolangit itself, and very close to Karo Regency. The village has many cafes, restaurants, shops selling tourist goods and tourist bungalows. It is also a lokalisasi (government licensed prostitution area)

In 1904 there was a battle at the village between the local Karo people and the colonial soldiers sent to "pacify the unruly highlanders."

Prostitution
Much of the prostitution in Bandar Baru is based in cafes. The prostitutes act as hostesses in the cafes and are available to be taken away from the cafe to provide sexual services. Some of the cafes are attached to hotels. As well as the money for sexual services, the prostitutes may also get a commission for the sale of drinks to their companions.

Some of the bungalows built for tourists have been turned into brothels.

Sex trafficking
As with other lokalisasi in Indonesia, sex trafficking, particularly of underage girls, is a significant problem.

Due to the bad name of Bandar Baru, and the problems associated with prostitution, the status of BB as a lokalisasi is being reviewed by the Deli Serdang government.

References

North Sumatra
Red-light districts in Indonesia